Events from the year 1955 in Japan.

Incumbents
Emperor: Hirohito
Prime Minister: Ichirō Hatoyama
Chief Cabinet Secretary: Ryutaro Nemoto
Chief Justice of the Supreme Court: Kōtarō Tanaka
President of the House of Representatives: Tō Matsunaga until January 24, Shūji Masutani from March 18
President of the House of Councillors: Yahachi Kawai

Governors
Aichi Prefecture: Mikine Kuwahara 
Akita Prefecture: Tokuji Ikeda (until 29 April); Yūjirō Obata (starting 30 April)
Aomori Prefecture: Bunji Tsushima
Chiba Prefecture: Hitoshi Shibata 
Ehime Prefecture: Sadatake Hisamatsu 
Fukui Prefecture: Harukazu Obata (until 4 February); Seiichi Hane (starting 26 April) 
Fukuoka Prefecture: Katsuji Sugimoto (until 7 April); Taichi Uzaki (starting 26 April)
Fukushima Prefecture: Sakuma Ootake 
Gifu Prefecture: Kamon Muto 
Gunma Prefecture: Shigeo Kitano 
Hiroshima Prefecture: Hiroo Ōhara 
Hokkaido: Toshifumi Tanaka 
Hyogo Prefecture: Masaru Sakamoto 
Ibaraki Prefecture: Yoji Tomosue 
Ishikawa Prefecture: Wakio Shibano (until 19 January); Jūjitsu Taya (starting 24 February)
Iwate Prefecture: Kenkichi Kokubun (until 29 April); Senichi Abe (starting 30 April)
Kagawa Prefecture: Masanori Kaneko 
Kagoshima Prefecture: Katsushi Terazono 
Kanagawa Prefecture: Iwataro Uchiyama 
Kochi Prefecture: Wakaji Kawamura (until 11 December); Masumi Mizobuchi (starting 12 December)
Kumamoto Prefecture: Saburō Sakurai 
Kyoto Prefecture: Torazō Ninagawa 
Mie Prefecture: Masaru Aoki (until 18 March); Satoru Tanaka (starting 23 April)
Miyagi Prefecture: Otogorō Miyagi 
Miyazaki Prefecture: Nagashige Tanaka (until 30 March); Jingo Futami (starting 23 April)
Nagano Prefecture: Torao Hayashi 
Nagasaki Prefecture: Takejirō Nishioka 
Nara Prefecture: Ryozo Okuda 
Niigata Prefecture: Shohei Okada (until 29 April) Kazuo Kitamura (starting 30 April)
Oita Prefecture: Tokuju Hosoda (until 27 April); Kaoru Kinoshita (starting 28 April)
Okayama Prefecture: Yukiharu Miki 
Osaka Prefecture: Bunzō Akama 
Saga Prefecture: Naotsugu Nabeshima 
Saitama Prefecture: Yuuichi Oosawa 
Shiga Prefecture: Kotaro Mori 
Shiname Prefecture: Yasuo Tsunematsu 
Shizuoka Prefecture: Toshio Saitō 
Tochigi Prefecture: Juukichi Kodaira (until 5 January); Kiichi Ogawa (starting 7 February)
Tokushima Prefecture: Kuniichi Abe (until 30 March); Kikutaro Hara (starting 25 April)
Tokyo: Seiichirō Yasui 
Tottori Prefecture: Shigeru Endo 
Toyama Prefecture: Kunitake Takatsuji 
Wakayama Prefecture: Shinji Ono 
Yamagata Prefecture: Michio Murayama (until 20 January); Tōkichi Abiko (starting 20 February)
Yamaguchi Prefecture: Taro Ozawa 
Yamanashi Prefecture: Hisashi Amano

Events
January 28 – Benesse Corporation was founded, as predecessor name was Fukutake Shoten.
February 17 - According to Japan Fire and Disaster Management Agency official confirmed report, Seibo no Sono (Our Lady's Garden) fire in Totsuka-ku, Yokohama, total 99 person were death.
February 27 - 1955 Japanese general election
April Unknown date – Bunka Shutter was founded, as predecessor name was Nippon Bunka Steel Door.
April 7 - Radio Tokyo TV (now Tokyo Broadcasting System Television (TBS)) begins broadcasting.
April 16–17 - Abe coal mine debris collapse, due to heavy torrential rain hit in Sasebo, Nagasaki Prefecture, resulting tn 73 persons death, according to JFDMA official confirmed report.
April 21 - Opening of Gokō Station
May 11 - Shiun Maru disaster
May 14 - According to Japan National Police Agency official confirmed report, a charter bus plunged into the Kitakami River in Iwate Prefecture, resulting in twelve deaths and twenty-eight injured.
 July 28- According to JFDMA official confirmed report, 36 junior school students died when a high wave hit, during school swimming lesson in Nakakawara beach, Tsu, Mie Prefecture.
September 3 - Yumiko-chan incident
November 1 - According to JFDMA official confirmed report, Moshiri Coal mine gas explosion hit in Akabira, Hokkaido, official death toll number is 60, with 17 person were wounded.
November 15 - Japan Liberal Party and Democratic Party of Japan were unified, ruling Liberal Democratic Party of Japan has started.
Establishment of Akkeshi Prefectural Natural Park

Births

 January 13 - Ran Itō, actress
 January 15 - Mayumi Tanaka, voice actress
 January 17 - Mami Koyama, voice actress
 January 20 - Hiromi Ōta, singer
 January 22 - Keiko Takahashi, actress
 January 28 - George Tokoro, television personality and singer-songwriter
 February 12 - Ai Satō, voice actress
 February 13 - Akiko Yano, singer-songwriter
 March 2 - Shoko Asahara, cult leader (Aum Shinrikyo)
 March 16 - Jiro Watanabe, boxer
 March 20 - Mariya Takeuchi, singer-songwriter
 April 5 - Akira Toriyama, Manga artist
 April 7 - Akira Nishino, soccer player and manager
 April 13 - Hideki Saijo, singer and actor (d. 2018)
 April 15 - Ryūtarō Nakamura, Anime director
 April 23 - Fumi Hirano, voice actress and essayist 
 April 29 - Yūko Tanaka, actress
 May 9 – Masayuki Kakefu, former professional baseball player 
 May 24 - Rumiko Ukai, voice actress
 May 25 - Suguru Egawa, baseball player
 May 26 - Masaharu Morimoto, chef
 May 30 - Nakamura Kanzaburō XVIII, Kabuki actor
 June 1 - Chiyonofuji Mitsugu, sumo wrestler (58th Yokozuna grand champion)
 June 26 - Yoko Gushiken, boxer
 July 1 - Sanma Akashiya, comedian and actor
 August 20 - Agnes Chan, television personality
 August 30 - Mayumi Muroyama, Manga artist
 September 4 - Hiroshi Izawa, actor
 September 24 - Shinbo Nomura, Manga artist
 October 18 - Hiromi Go, singer
 October 19 - LaSalle Ishii, television personality
 October 21 - Yasukazu Hamada, politician
 October 29 - Etsuko Shihomi, actress
 November 3 - Yukihiko Tsutsumi, film director
 November 14 - Koichi Nakano, bicycle rider
 December 9 - Asashio Tarō IV, sumo wrestler
 December 16 - Chiharu Matsuyama, singer-songwriter
 December 24 - Mizuho Fukushima, politician

Deaths
February 17 - Ango Sakaguchi, author (b. 1906)
October 15 - Fumio Hayasaka, composer (b. 1914)
October 25 - Sadako Sasaki, hibakusha (b. 1943)

See also
 List of Japanese films of 1955

References

 
1950s in Japan
Years of the 20th century in Japan